Events in the year 2019 in Bosnia and Herzegovina.

Incumbents 

 President – Milorad Dodik, Šefik Džaferović and Željko Komšić
 Prime Minister – Denis Zvizdić (until December 23) Zoran Tegeltija (from December 23)

Events

January 
22 January – Five foreign demining experts, including one Bosnian, were killed in an accidental explosion in Yemen.

June 
1 June – Twenty-nine people were injured in a fire at a center used as temporary accommodation for about 500 migrants in the northwestern Bosnian town of Velika Kladusa.

November 
26 November – Earthquakes occurred in southern Bosnia.

December 
5 December – The country takes full control of its airspace for the first time since the end of the Bosnian War. Bosnia's air space had been controlled by NATO between 1995 and 2003, following which it was controlled jointly by Serbia and Croatia until this announcement.
23 December – The Bosnian parliament approves Prime Minister Zoran Tegeltija's cabinet after a 14-month deadlock, caused by disagreements over proceeding with NATO integration, with Tegeltija stating his main priority is pursuing membership with the European Union.
31 December – Former Bosnian Serb Army general Milomir Savčić is indicted for his role in planning the Srebrenica massacre.

Deaths

References

 
Years of the 21st century in Bosnia and Herzegovina
2010s in Bosnia and Herzegovina
Bosnia and Herzegovina
Bosnia and Herzegovina